Dodge City USD 443, also known as Dodge City Public Schools, is a public unified school district headquartered in Dodge City, Kansas, United States.  The district includes the communities of Dodge City, Fort Dodge, Wright, and nearby rural areas.

Schools
The school district operates the following schools:

High school
 Dodge City High School (9-12)

Middle schools
 Comanche Middle School (6-8)
 Dodge City Middle School (6-8)

Elementary schools
 Bright Beginnings Early Childhood Center (Grades Pre-K)
 Beeson Elementary School (K-5)
 Central Elementary School (K-5)
 Linn Elementary School (K-5)
 Miller Elementary School (K-5)
 Northwest Elementary School (K-5)
 Ross Elementary School (K-5)
 Soule Elementary School (K-5)
 Sunnyside Elementary School (K-5)
 RISE Wilroads Gardens

Alternative schools
 Alternative Education School

See also
 Kansas State Department of Education
 Kansas State High School Activities Association
 List of high schools in Kansas
 List of unified school districts in Kansas

References

External links
 

School districts in Kansas
Dodge City, Kansas
Education in Ford County, Kansas